Denmark–Kosovo relations are foreign relations between Denmark and Kosovo.  Kosovo declared its independence from Serbia on 17 February 2008 and Denmark recognized it on 21 February 2008. Ambassador of Denmark to Kosovo, subordinate to the embassy in Vienna, Austria from 6 March 2008.

Military

Denmark contributed up to 308 soldiers to the NATO-led Kosovo Force. In November 2010, a 152-member unit remained in the force.

Prison lease 
Denmark and Kosovo has signed an agreement for Denmark to rent 300 prison cells in Kosovo, which Denmark plans to use for prison sentenced migrants.

See also 
 Foreign relations of Denmark
 Foreign relations of Kosovo
 Denmark–Serbia relations

External links
 DENMARK, KOSOVO SIGN DEPORTATION TREATY
 Kosovo Repatriation Country Survey: Denmark: Kosovo

Notes and references
Notes:

References:

 
Denmark
Kosovo